Aquabiking (also called Aqua cycling) is the combination of water sports and cycling sports. Two activities share the term. One is an underwater indoor cycling, and the other is a race featuring swimming and cycling stages.

See also
International Triathlon Union

References

Swimming
Cycle racing